Last Mountain was a federal electoral district in Saskatchewan, Canada, that was represented in the House of Commons of Canada from 1917 to 1935. This riding was created in 1914 from parts of Humboldt, Regina and Saskatoon ridings

It was abolished in 1933 when it was redistributed into Lake Centre, Melville and Yorkton ridings.

Election results

See also 

 List of Canadian federal electoral districts
 Past Canadian electoral districts

External links 
 

Former federal electoral districts of Saskatchewan